Hamptoniella is an extinct genus of sponges known from the Middle Cambrian Burgess Shale.

References

External links 
 

Protomonaxonida
Burgess Shale sponges
Prehistoric sponge genera
Cambrian genus extinctions